Eugenia Osho-Williams (born 19 January 1961) is a Sierra Leonean sprinter. She competed in the 100 metres at the 1980 Summer Olympics and the 1984 Summer Olympics. She was the first woman to represent Sierra Leone at the Olympics.

References

External links
 

1961 births
Living people
Athletes (track and field) at the 1980 Summer Olympics
Athletes (track and field) at the 1984 Summer Olympics
Sierra Leonean female sprinters
Olympic athletes of Sierra Leone
Place of birth missing (living people)
Olympic female sprinters